The Ralph D. Turlington Florida Education Center, commonly known as the Turlington Building and colloquially known as The Razor, is an 18-story building in downtown Tallahassee, Florida. The building was completed in 1989. It houses the Florida Department of Education and was named after former Education Commissioner Ralph Turlington.

References 

Skyscrapers in Florida
Buildings and structures in Tallahassee, Florida
Skyscraper office buildings in Florida
Office buildings completed in 1989
1989 establishments in Florida